Clara Michelle Barker is a British engineer and material scientist. In 2017 she received the Points of Light award from the UK Prime Minister's Office for her volunteer work raising awareness of lesbian, gay, bisexual and transgender issues. The outcome of this was her rise as a significant role model to the LGBT+ community.

Career and research 
Barker completed her thesis on thin film coating at Manchester Metropolitan University. She then held a post-doctoral position at the Swiss Federal Laboratories for Materials Science and Technology (EMPA) in Switzerland for four years, before she moved to the University of Oxford, where she manages the Centre for Applied Superconductivity within the Materials Department. She is also chair of the University's LGBT+ Advisory Group.

LGBT+ advocacy 
Barker is a transgender woman and an advocate for LGBT+ diversity and women in STEM. She works with two youth groups in Oxfordshire, Topaz and My Normal. She also speaks in local schools on behalf of Stonewall and has helped Oxford City Council run an anti-HBT bullying initiative. In 2017, she was featured in a Stonewall poster campaign for Trans Day of Visibility. She also led the promotion of the Out in Oxford project, a project which highlights LGBT+ artefacts in museums. She has given numerous talks on LGBT+ visibility and diversity in STEM. In December 2018 Barker gave a TEDx talk entitled "Why we need to build trust to create diversity in institutions". She has also appeared on BBC Victoria Derbyshire and Sky News talking about transgender rights.

Barker has received several awards for her advocacy. In 2017 she was the 795th person to receive the Points of Light award for her work with Out in Oxford her other volunteering. Her belief is that role models are necessary in all aspects of life. Her representation in STEM has been pivotal for following generations to follow in her footsteps.

In 2018, she won the staff Individual Champion/Role Model award in the Vice-Chancellor's Diversity Awards from the University of Oxford.

References 

21st-century British women scientists
21st-century British engineers
Alumni of Manchester Metropolitan University
British materials scientists
British women activists
British women academics
British women's rights activists
Living people
British transgender people
British LGBT rights activists
British LGBT scientists
People associated with the University of Oxford
Superconductivity scientists and engineers
Transgender academics
Transgender women
Transgender scientists
Women materials scientists and engineers
Year of birth missing (living people)
Women civil rights activists
21st-century British LGBT people